Singor is a rural locality (a village) in Malyginskoye Rural Settlement, Kovrovsky District, Vladimir Oblast, Russia. The population was 7 as of 2010.

Geography 
Singor is located on the Singorka River, 22 km northwest of Kovrov (the district's administrative centre) by road. Klimovo is the nearest rural locality.

References 

Rural localities in Kovrovsky District